Giulio Sarrocchi (24 May 1887 – 18 July 1971) was an Italian fencer. He won a gold medal at the 1924 Summer Olympics and a silver at the 1928 Games in the team sabre competitions.

References

External links
 

1887 births
1971 deaths
Italian male fencers
Olympic fencers of Italy
Fencers at the 1924 Summer Olympics
Fencers at the 1928 Summer Olympics
Olympic gold medalists for Italy
Olympic silver medalists for Italy
Olympic medalists in fencing
Fencers from Rome
Medalists at the 1924 Summer Olympics
Medalists at the 1928 Summer Olympics